Mark Andrew LeVine is an American historian, musician, writer, and professor. He is a professor of history at the University of California, Irvine.

Education 
LeVine received his B.A. in comparative religion and biblical studies from Hunter College and his M.A. and Ph.D. from New York University's Department of Middle Eastern Studies. He speaks multiple languages including Arabic, Hebrew, Turkish, Persian, Italian, French, German and English.

Israeli–Palestinian conflict
With regard to the Israeli–Palestinian conflict, LeVine argues for a 'parallel states' scenario, involving the dissolution of borders and overlapping sovereignty across the entirety of historic Palestine. LeVine has recently theorized that the only trope which can explain what he calls Israel's 'totalitarian' control over Palestinian people is that afforded by Quantum Mechanics. By totalitarian he does not mean the systems that prevailed in Nazi Germany, Fascist states, or Communist Russia and China, but the intricate matrix of control established by the Israeli occupation throughout the spatial territory Palestinians inhabit, by virtue of which the Palestinians have no more influence over their life paths than an electron in a field does. This control extends to the airspace, and underground (harvesting the water resources), to the present and the past, making for a unique synergy of "bio" and "necro"-politics. He claims that maps created by ICAHD show that a dozen control parameters are in place at any one coordinate point in the West Bank. The result in his view is that the Israeli occupation,'represents criminalized state behavior at the most systematic, intricately planned and executed, widest possible scale, and longest duration.'

Music
LeVine is an accomplished rock guitarist and has played with noted rock and world beat musicians such as Mick Jagger, Chuck D, Michael Franti, and Doctor John. He recorded with Moroccan Hassan Hakmoun, and the French Gypsy band Les Yeux Noirs on Ozomatli's album Street Signs, which won the Grammy for Best Latin Rock/Alternative album in 2005.

Views
LeVine, in analyzing historian Noel Ignatiev's anti-racism writings on the white race, concurred in 2019 that "abolishing whiteness has never been more urgent", openly supporting Noel Ignatiev’s position in the "condemnation of an irredeemable whiteness and the identities that flow from it" with a simple quote: “As long as you think you’re white, there’s no hope for you.”.

Books
Overthrowing Geography: Jaffa, Tel Aviv and the Struggle for Palestine; University of California Press (2005) 
Why They Don't Hate Us: Lifting the Veil on the Axis of Evil; Oneworld Publications (2005)  
An Impossible Peace: Oslo and the Burdens of History; Zed Books (2007) 
Heavy Metal Islam: Rock, Resistance, and the Struggle for the Soul of Islam; Three Rivers Press, New York (2008) 
Struggle and Survival in Palestine/Israel, Mark LeVine, Gershon Shafir, University of California Press (2012) 

LeVine's book Why They Don't Hate Us was hailed by Douglas A. Davis, Emeritus Professor of Psychology at Haverford College as an innovative, trenchant analysis, massively documented, of the West's 'cultural jamming' within the modern Arab world, together with a powerful diagnosis of neoconservative thinkers and the pretensions of globalization.

British journalist Bryan Appleyard gave it a mixed review in the London Sunday Times . Appleyard was sternly critical of the book's style and organization, and disparaged the ideological underpinnings, rooted in "idealism," which, he claimed, informed Levine's work. Appleyard nevertheless wrote,  "LeVine is absolutely right and, indeed, quite brave to insist on the reality of complexity. Terrorism and war both tend to simplify world views and, without doubting their intellectual status, so do the utopians of the new right... Perhaps his book’s greatest virtue is that it introduces both the many shades of opinion and cultural complexity of the, largely, Arab world... LeVine detonates the uneasy but nonetheless profound complacency that seems to have invaded politics."

Co-edited books
Twilight of Empire: Responses to Occupation co-edited with Viggo Mortensen and Pilar Perez; Perceval Press (2004)
Religion, Social Practices and Contested Hegemonies: Reconstructing the Public Sphere in Muslim Majority Societies co-edited with Armando Salvatore; Palgrave Press (2005)
Reapproaching the Border: News Perspectives on the Study of Israel and Palestine co-edited with Sandra Sufian; Rowman and Littlefield (2007)

See also
Culture jamming

References

External links
 Culturejamming.org Mark Levine's website 
 Mark LeVine at Levantine Cultural Center 
 Faculty Page at University of California Irvine with current bibliography 
 Blog video featuring Mark LeVine 
 First al-Bashir, next ... Bush?

21st-century American historians
21st-century American male writers
American rock guitarists
Middle Eastern studies in the United States
Hunter College alumni
New York University alumni
University of California, Irvine faculty
Living people
Year of birth missing (living people)
American male non-fiction writers